West Concord is an unincorporated village and census-designated place (CDP) in the town of Concord in Middlesex County, Massachusetts, United States. The population was 6,028 at the 2010 census.

Geography
West Concord is located at  (42.454747, -71.400495).

According to the United States Census Bureau, the CDP has a total area of 9.3 km (3.6 mi). 8.8 km (3.4 mi) of it is land and 0.5 km (0.2 mi) of it (5.01%) is water.

Demographics

At the 2000 census there were 5,632 people, 1,844 households, and 1,296 families living in the CDP. The population density was 637.7/km (1,651.6/mi). There were 1,914 housing units at an average density of 216.7/km (561.3/mi).  The racial makeup of the CDP was 83.59% White, 5.82% Black or African American, 0.11% Native American, 3.50% Asian, 0.02% Pacific Islander, 5.61% from other races, and 1.35% from two or more races. Hispanic or Latino of any race were 6.18%.

Of the 1,844 households 34.2% had children under the age of 18 living with them, 59.7% were married couples living together, 8.5% had a female householder with no husband present, and 29.7% were non-families. 25.4% of households were one person and 10.4% were one person aged 65 or older. The average household size was 2.48 and the average family size was 3.00.

The age distribution was 20.3% under the age of 18, 6.2% from 18 to 24, 35.3% from 25 to 44, 25.5% from 45 to 64, and 12.8% 65 or older. The median age was 39 years. For every 100 females, there were 131.0 males. For every 100 females age 18 and over, there were 142.5 males.

The median household income was $86,096 and the median family income  was $102,210. Males had a median income of $56,053 versus $50,774 for females. The per capita income for the CDP was $43,271. About 1.9% of families and 3.0% of the population were below the poverty line, including 1.4% of those under age 18 and 5.6% of those age 65 or over.

References

Census-designated places in Middlesex County, Massachusetts
Census-designated places in Massachusetts